Bathynotus is a genus of trilobites of the family Bathynotidae. Its fossils have been found in the paleocontinents Laurentia (specifically in what are now Nevada and Vermont), Gondwana (in South China and South-Australia), and - doubtfully - Siberia. It is characterized by a very wide axis in the thorax and an enlarged 11th segment that bears a long, backwardly directed spine on each side. Additionally, the 12th and 13th segments are narrow and fuse with the edge of the spine of the 11th segment.

Etymology 
Bathynotus is derived from the Greek words βαθυς -bathus- meaning "ample"; and νοτος -notos- meaning "back", for the very wide axis of the thorax. The species names are derived as follows. 
elongatus means lengthened, for the greater body length of this species.
holopygus means entire shield, for the pygidium that has a smooth border.
kueichoensis comes from Kweichow (now Guizhou Province) in China where this species was collected.

References

External links
 Discussion of the taxonomic position of Bathynotus

Redlichiida genera
Cambrian trilobites of Australia

Cambrian genus extinctions